The Bright Lights and What I Should Have Learned is an album by Duels released July 2006. It was released as a standard edition and limited edition version in a deluxe embossed box.

It received a positive review in the New Musical Express (NME), garnering an 8/10 review score, 4/5 in Clash magazine, 4 stars in Time Out and was named Album of the Week in The Sunday Times, The Guardian and on XFM.

Track listing
"Brothers and Sisters" – 3:51
"Things" – 4:15
"Potential Futures" – 3:34
"The Slow Build" – 5:15
"The Monsters Are Loose" – 4:10
"Animal" – 3:08
"What We Did Wrong" – 4:09
"Pressure on You" – 2:42
"Young Believers" – 5:05
"Once in the Night" – 3:38
"Taxi Song" – 4:04

Personnel
Mixed by James Ford, Duels & Dave Sardy

References

2006 albums
Albums produced by James Ford (musician)
Duels (band) albums